"Time 4 Sum Aksion" is the second single from Redman's highly acclaimed debut album, Whut? Thee Album. It features production from Erick Sermon and Redman that contains a sample from Lowell Fulson's "Tramp".

Song information
Its chorus is a repetition of the phrase "Time 4 Sum Aksion" which is sampled from "How I Could Just Kill a Man" by Cypress Hill.

It is a popular song within hip hop and has been referenced by Common in his song "Sum Shit I Wrote" and Masta Ace in eMC's song "What It Stand For?". It can be found on the Def Jam hits compilation, Old 2 New, New 2 Old.

Steve Huey of Allmusic has referred to it as a "slamming party jam".

In popular culture

Mike Tyson chose this song as his introduction music for his first fight upon his prison release. 
In The Simpsons episode number 3 of season 8 "The Homer They Fall," the Tyson-inspired boxer Drederick Tatum also uses this song as introduction music.
UFC Middleweight Champion Anderson Silva used this as his entrance song at UFC 64 and UFC 67.
Rashad Evans used this as his entrance song at UFC 98.
Anthony Johnson used this as his entrance song at UFC 106.

Single track list

A-Side
 "Time 4 Sum Aksion" (LP Version) (3:17)
 "Time 4 Sum Aksion" (Remix) (3:15)

B-Side
 "Time 4 Sum Aksion" (Remix Instrumental) (3:12)
 "Rated "R"" (LP Version) (3:21)

Samples Used
"Playin' Kinda Ruff" by Zapp
"How I Could Just Kill a Man" by Cypress Hill
"Tramp" by Lowell Fulsom
"Sing A Simple Song" by Sly & The Family Stone
"Mama Said Knock You Out" by LL Cool J
"Get Up & Get Down" by The Dramatics
"Top Billin'" by Audio Two
"Thriller" by Michael Jackson

References

1993 singles
Redman (rapper) songs
Song recordings produced by Erick Sermon
Def Jam Recordings singles
Hardcore hip hop songs
Funk-rap songs
Songs written by DJ Muggs
Songs written by Roger Troutman
Songs written by Redman (rapper)
1992 songs